The 2016 Patriot League men's soccer season was the 24th season of men's varsity soccer in the conference.

The Colgate Raiders and Lehigh Mountain Hawks are the defending regular season and tournament champions, respectively.

Changes from 2015 

 None

Teams

Stadia and locations

Regular season

Rankings

Results

Postseason

Patriot League Tournament

Tournament details to be announced.

NCAA tournament

All-Patriot League awards and teams

See also 
 2016 NCAA Division I men's soccer season
 2016 Patriot League Men's Soccer Tournament
 2016 Patriot League women's soccer season

References 

 
2016 NCAA Division I men's soccer season